Drymini is a tribe of dirt-colored seed bugs in the family Rhyparochromidae. There are more than 300 described species in Drymini.

Genera
The Lygaeoidea Species File lists:

 Appolonius Distant, 1901
 Austrodrymus Gross, 1965
 Bexiocoris Scudder, 1969
 Borneodrymus Kondorosy, 2006
 Brachydrymus Gross, 1965
 Brentiscerus Scudder, 1962
 Carvalhodrymus Slater, 1995
 Chotekia China, 1935
 Coracodrymus Breddin, 1901
 Drymus Fieber, 1861
 Dudia Bergroth, 1918
 Entisberus Distant, 1903
 Eremocoris Fieber, 1861
 Esinerus Scudder, 1969
 Faelicianus Distant, 1901
 Gastrodes Westwood, 1840
 Gastrodomorpha Gross, 1965
 Grossander Slater, 1976
 Heissodrymus Kondorosy, 2006
 Hidakacoris Tomokuni, 1998
 Hirtomydrus Scudder, 1978
 Ibexocoris Scudder, 1963
 Ischnocoris Fieber, 1861
 Kanigara Distant, 1906
 Lamproplax Douglas & Scott, 1868
 Latidrymus Kondorosy, 2017
 Lemnius Distant, 1904
 Malipatilius Kondorosy, 2013
 Megadrymus Gross, 1965
 Mizaldus Distant, 1901
 Neodudia Scudder, 1978
 Neomizaldus Scudder, 1968
 Notochilaster Breddin, 1907
 Notochilus Fieber, 1864
 Orsillodes Puton, 1884
 Paradieuches Distant, 1883
 Paradrymus Bergroth, 1916
 Parastilbocoris Carayon, 1964
 Pilusodrymus Scudder, 1969
 Potamiaena Distant, 1910
 Pseudodrymus Gross, 1965
 Retoka China, 1935
 Retrodrymus Gross, 1965
 Rhodiginus Distant, 1901
 Salaciola Bergroth, 1906
 Scolopostethus Fieber, 1861
 Sinierus Distant, 1901
 Stilbocoris Bergroth, 1893
 Taphropeltus Stal, 1872
 Testudodrymus Slater, 1993
 Thaumastopus Fieber, 1870
 Thebanus Distant, 1904
 Thylochromus Barber, 1928
 Togodolentus Barber, 1918
 Trichodrymus Lindberg, 1927
 Udalricus (bug) Distant, 1904
 Usilanus Distant, 1909
 Uzza Distant, 1909

References

Further reading

External links

 

Lygaeoidea
Drymini
Hemiptera tribes